"Mama Liked the Roses" is a song by Elvis Presley released in 1970. The song was released as the B-side to "The Wonder of You" 45 single on April 20, 1970, and on the 1970 RCA Camden reissue of Elvis' Christmas Album.

Background

The song was recorded on January 16, 1969.

The song peaked at #9 on the Billboard Hot 100 singles chart in a pairing with "The Wonder of You". The song was composed by Johnny Christopher, who also co-wrote "If You Talk in Your Sleep" and "Always on My Mind", both recorded by Elvis Presley.

References

1969 songs
Elvis Presley songs
Songs written by Johnny Christopher